Mokkavatnet is a lake in the Ogndal area of the municipality of Steinkjer in Trøndelag county, Norway. The lake is one of the headwaters of the river Ogna.

See also
List of lakes in Norway

References

Steinkjer
Lakes of Trøndelag